The Durban Light Infantry is a Motorised Infantry regiment of the South African Army. It lost its status as a Mechanised infantry regiment in 2010 in line with the rationalisation of resources. As a reserve unit, it has a status roughly equivalent to that of a British Army Reserve or United States Army National Guard unit.

History

Origin
The Regiment was formed as the D’Urban Volunteer Guard, in May 1854.
In 1859 the unit became the Durban Rifle Guard.
In 1873 the unit became known as the Royal Durban Rifles.
In 1889 the unit became known as the Natal Royal Rifles (Left half Battalion).
In 1895 it became the Durban Light Infantry.

With the Union Defence Force
On the constitution of the Union Defence Force in 1912, the Unit became the Durban Light Infantry, renamed the 1st Infantry, (Durban Light Infantry).  In consequence the Unit was permitted to add to its badge " in Africa", the motto retained by the unit today in recognition of its foundation.

Seniority
In 1935, King George V conferred the title Royal on two Regiments being the Royal Durban Light Infantry and the Royal Natal Carbineers, as a recognition of their seniority and service.

In 1961 with the formation of the Republic, the title "Royal" was considered incompatible and the Regiment reverted to being the Durban Light Infantry.

Regimental Colours
At the centre of the 'Regimental Colour' is the badge worn by the Regiment since 1961.  It consists of the recognised Infantry Silver Bugle with tassels and a shield with two wildebeest and a crown.  The wildebeest are symbolic of the Province, while the crown retained as a traditional device is reminiscent of the title "Royal" bestowed upon the Regiment by King George V in 1935.

The words " in Africa" are superimposed within a scroll.

The crest is composed of a lion passant guardant on three mounds – the centre mound being charged with a pyramid.  The lion is symbolic of strength, courage and fortitude.  The three mounds are symbolic of the battles fought in World War II – Monte Stanco, Monte Peza and Monte Sole/Caprara.  The pyramid is symbolic of the 1941–1943 Egyptian Campaign.

The garland which surrounds the coloured badge comprises the Thistle of Scotland, the Tudor Rose of England and the Shamrock of Ireland – symbols taken from the old colour – and the other two flowers, the Protea, the National flower of South Africa, and the Strelitzia, the flower of Natal (now KwaZulu-Natal).

Previous Dress Insignia

Current Dress Insignia

Active Service

Battle Honours

Service 
 South Africa, Anglo-Zulu War 1879
 South Africa, Anglo-Boer War 18991902
 Relief of Ladysmith 1900
 Natal, Bambatha Rebellion 1906
 South West Africa 19141915
 East Africa 19161918
 Rand Miners' Revolt 1922
 World War II
 Western Desert 19411943 (See 1st SA Infantry Division)
 Bardia
 Gazala
 Alamein Defence
 Alamein Box
 El Alamein
 Italy 19441945
 Casino II
 Florence
 Gothic Line
 Monte Stanco
 Monte Pezza
 Sole/Caprara
 Po Valley
 South West Africa – Namibia 19761994, five tours.
 Internally in South Africa in support of the SAPS (SA. Police Service) in the following actions;
 1949, 1960, 1961
 1985, 1986, 1987, 1989, 1991, 1992 (mainly rural areas)
 1994 Elections.
 1996 Elections.
 1999 Elections.
 2006 Op in Burundi. Detached members to Standing Army control structures.
 20072014. Internal operations.

Leadership

Regimental Headquarters
The regimental headquarters of the DLI has been declared as a National Monument.

Peacekeeping deployments and training
The Regiment is being deployed in Africa, Burundi, DRC; in support of the United Nations and African Union mandate

All members of the Regiment are volunteers, with employment in the civilian roles, they fulfil their responsibilities and duties on top of their duties and responsibilities to their Families and Employers.  An enormous commitment to the safety and security of the Republic of South Africa.

Training is mandatory with the current requirements of Equality and Equity in line with the SANDF Policy.  The duration of training places an enormous pressure on members to get Employers to relieve them to attend the courses and training exercises.

Regimental history
"Durban Light Infantry" by Lieut Col AC Martin  BA (Cape) Hon.PhD (Natal) was published in 1969. It is out of print.

An illustrated history of the 150 years of the Regiment has been prepared by Prof. Brian Kearney, Mr Dave Matthews and Lieut Col "Bill" Olivier  (Retd.).  The book is being sold by the Headquarters Board.

Affiliations
The Rifle Brigade 1920.
The Royal Green Jackets RGJ 1966

Notes

References

External links
Record of the Durban Light Infantry

Infantry regiments of South Africa
Military units and formations in Durban
Military units and formations of the Cold War
Military units and formations of the Second Boer War
Military units and formations of the British Empire
Military units and formations of South Africa in World War II
Military units and formations of South Africa in World War I
Military units and formations of South Africa in the Border War
Military units and formations established in 1854
1854 establishments in the British Empire